This is a timeline of major events in the history of the city of Melbourne, Australia.

Pre-European settlement
Aboriginal Australians settled the area for at least 30,000 years.

19th century

1800 – James Grant explores the south-east of Australia
1801 – John Murray sails into Port Phillip in the Lady Nelson
1803 – Charles Robbins and Charles Grimes explore the entirety of Port Phillip and discover the Yarra River in the 
1803 – David Collins sent from Sydney to establish a settlement for the British Government. Unaware of previous discoveries, Collins settles near present-day Sullivan Bay on the Mornington Peninsula. This settlement is abandoned five months later.
1834 – Henty family establish first long-term European settlement in Victoria at Portland
1835 – John Batman 'buys' the 2,430 km2 that Melbourne would be founded on from the local Aboriginal nation, the Wurundjeri. The Batman Deed is now widely recognised to be more of a treaty than a sale.
1835 – Melbourne is founded by John Batman and John Pascoe Fawkner
1836 – William Lonsdale built the first government block, declaring Melbourne the capital of the Port Phillip district
1837 – 28 March – Hoddle Grid of streets for the central business district is surveyed by Robert Hoddle
1837 – 10 April - Melbourne named by Governor General Richard Bourke
1837 – 1 June – First inner-city land sale
1838 – Melbourne is declared a legal port and administrative centre, opening the way for vastly increased immigration
1838 – Melbourne Cricket Club is founded
1838 – Second inner-city land sale
1839 – Third inner-city land sale.  Quarrying of bluestone began out of the Melbourne Corporation Quarry at Clifton Hill.
1840 – First petition for the separation of Port Phillip District from New South Wales drafted by Henry Fyshe Gisborne and presented to Governor George Gipps.
1841 – First seaport and market are opened
1842 – Melbourne Municipal Corporation Act was passed in Sydney.  Melbourne City Council is formed.
1845 – First Princes Bridge constructed connecting both sides of the Yarra
1846 – The Melbourne Botanic Gardens is founded
1847 – Melbourne declared a city by Queen Victoria on 25 June.
1847 – Melbourne Building Act was proposed in 1847 based on Sydney act of 1833.
1848 – Melbourne Hospital founded (from 1935 the hospital is called The Royal Melbourne Hospital)
1849 - "Melbourne Building Act" was passed.
1851 – Beginning of the Victorian gold rush with discovery of gold at Buninyong
1851 – Victoria becomes a colony, separate from New South Wales
1851 – First state Lieutenant-Governor Charles La Trobe inaugurated
1852 – City's first gas works is opened
1853 – The University of Melbourne is founded
1854 – The Melbourne Terminus (first Flinders Street station building) is completed
1854 – First steam railway journey in Australia from Melbourne Terminus (on the current site of Flinders Street station) to Sandridge (later Port Melbourne)
1854 – Melbourne Exhibition held in conjunction with Exposition Universelle (1855)
1854 – The State Library of Victoria is founded
1854 – First telegraph service, to Williamstown
1854 – The first Town Hall is completed
1855 – First state Governor Sir Charles Hotham inaugurated
1855 – The Melbourne Museum is founded
1856 – Stonemasons win the eight-hour day
1857 – First reservoir water supply (at Yan Yean Reservoir) tapped outside city limits
1857 – Queen Victoria Market is founded
1857 – Victoria's first country railway from Geelong to Melbourne is built
1857 – City streets first lit by gas lighting
1858 – 7 August – a game of football played between Melbourne Grammar School and Scotch College
1858 –  First inter-city telegraph services, to Adelaide and Sydney
1859 – 14 May – Melbourne Football Club, Australia's oldest football club, is founded
1859 – Spencer Street station (then Batman's Hill Station) and Princes Bridge railway station completed
1859 – Construction of the General Post Office begins
1859 – First Melbourne Trades Hall building opened.
1860 – Burke & Wills expedition departed from Royal Park.
1861 – National Gallery of Victoria is founded
1861 – First Melbourne Cup
1861 – Victorian Exhibition held
1861 – Melbourne's population reaches 125,000
1862 – Melbourne Zoo founded
1863 – Batman's Hill levelled
1865 – Melbourne overtakes Sydney to become Australia's most populous city
1866 – Intercolonial Exhibition of Australasia held
1867 – Melbourne Town Hall begins construction
1869 – Royal Mint is completed
1874 – Supreme Court building is completed
1875 – Victorian Intercolonial Exhibition held
1877 – First Test cricket match, between Australia and England, at the Melbourne Cricket Ground. First season of the Victorian Football Association.
1878 – Xavier College, in Kew, is founded after the increased need of boarding space for the oldest Jesuit School in Melbourne, St Pat's.
1878 – Ruyton Girls' School, also in Kew is founded by Charlotte Anderson. Its land includes the heritage listed Henty House, built by the seminal Hentys of Sussex.
1880 – Ned Kelly hanged in Melbourne Gaol
1880 – Royal Exhibition Building opened
1880 – Melbourne International Exhibition held
1883 – Historic Yarra-Yarra Falls (near Queens Bridge) removed using explosives
1884 – Victorian International Exhibition held
1885 – First cable tram line opens in the Melbourne cable tramway system
1885 – Victorians' Jubilee Exhibition
1887 – Melbourne Town Hall is completed
1888 – Victorian Juvenile Industrial Exhibition and Centennial International Exhibition held
1890 – Melbourne and Metropolitan Board of Works is formed
1894 – City streets first lit by electric lighting
1897 – First season of the Victorian Football League
1897 – First part of the mains sewage system becomes operational

20th century

1900 – Upper Ferntree Gully to Gembrook narrow-gauge railway (now Puffing Billy Railway) opens
1900 – Construction of the current Flinders Street station building begins
1901 – Commonwealth of Australia is formed. Melbourne becomes national capital
1902 – Sydney reclaims title from Melbourne as Australia's most populous city
1903 – City Baths are opened
1905 – First Australian Open championship
1905 – Melbourne Continuation School, Victoria's first state secondary school, is founded in Spring Street
1906 – First electric tram service commences
1907 – General Post Office is completed
1910 – Current Flinders Street station building is completed
1913 – The Domed Reading Room of the State Library is opened
1916 – Strict height limit of 132 feet (40 metres) imposed on all buildings
1916 – Introduction of 6:00pm closing for all hotels (abolished in 1966)
1919 – Electric suburban train services commence on the Broadmeadows line
1923 – W-class trams introduced.
1923 – 1923 Victorian Police strike
1924 – First radio station 3AR (now known as Radio National.)
1927 – Federal Parliament is moved to Canberra, the new national capital
1928 – Melbourne City Council installs the city's first set of traffic lights at Collins & Swanston Streets
1934 – Centenary of Melbourne
1934 – Shrine of Remembrance completed and dedicated
1940 – Last cable tram service ends operation
1943 – Russell Street Police Headquarters building is completed
1954 – April—Victorian Railways closes the Upper Ferntree Gully to Gembrook narrow-gauge railway (now Puffing Billy Railway)
1954 – First Moomba parade
1954 – Proposal to demolish much of East Melbourne and Jolimont Yard to make way for an inner city ringroad.
1955 – City's first parking meters are installed
1955 – ICI building given special exception from CBD height limits
1956 – First television station HSV-7
1956 – Olympic Games held in Melbourne
1957 – Plot ratio height limits introduced to CBD (dependent upon floor space and light angles), plazas and open space. By laws introduced for compulsory carspace for all new city buildings.  1.45 m setbacks for 'Little' streets introduced to widen footpaths.
1959 – Sidney Myer Music Bowl opened
1961 – Proposal to demolish Flinders Street station and replace it with office blocks.
1962 – Puffing Billy Railway is re-opened as a tourist attraction
1966 – Abolition of 6:00pm closing of hotels (introduced in 1916)
1967 – first woman city councillor Clare Cascarret
1969 – Proposal to demolish the Regent Theatre for multi-storey development.
1970 – Green Bans begin in Carlton, and are led by Norm Gallagher. Green Bans would later be applied to the City Baths, Flinders Street Station, Hotel Windsor, Newport Power Station, the Old Treasury Building, Princess Theatre, Queen Victoria Market, Regent Theatre, the Royal Botanical Gardens, Royal Parade and St Patrick's Cathedral, among many other locations.
1970 – (15 October) 35 construction workers die when a span of the West Gate Bridge collapses
1974 – Underground City Loop construction begins
1975 – Z-class tram introduced
1975 – 1 March, Colour television introduced.
1979 – Workers at the Union Carbide-owned Altona Petrochemical Plant take control of the workplace for 52 days in protest of their firing.
1982 – City Loop subway opened
1983 – (8 February) Melbourne dust storm and (16 February) Ash Wednesday fires occur
1983 – Melbourne Fringe Festival founded
1985 – B-class trams introduced
1986 – Car-bombing outside the Russell Street Police Headquarters kills one police officer
1986 – Rialto Towers completed and becomes the city's tallest building as well as the tallest in the southern hemisphere
1986 – Pablo Picasso's The Weeping Woman is stolen from National Gallery of Victoria by activists. Returned a week later.
1986 – Melbourne International Arts Festival founded
1987 – Hoddle Street Massacre, killing 7 and injuring 19.
1987 – Queen Street Massacre, killing 8 and injuring 5.
1987 – Port Melbourne and St Kilda train lines are converted to light rail
1990 – Tram drivers across the city go on strike and attempt to implement workers control in the Tram network.
1990 – Southbank Promenade opens, paving the way for urban renewal in Southbank
1991 – Melbourne experiences a severe economic slump; City property markets crash and CBD vacancy rates reach all-time high.
1992 – Pedestrianisation of Swanston Street creates Swanston Street Walk
1992 – Postcode 3000 policy attracts residents to the city centre, warehouses and offices are converted into apartments and CBD vacancy rates drop
1994 – Opening of the Melbourne Observation Deck in Rialto Towers
1994 – Tasty nightclub raid
1995 – Host City to the World Police & Fire Games
1996 – Development of the Docklands area begins
1996 – Construction of the CityLink freeways begins
1996 – Melbourne Convention & Exhibition Centre opens
1996 – Melbourne hosts its first Australian Grand Prix at the Albert Park Circuit
1997 – Crown Melbourne, Melbourne's first gambling centre opens
1999 – Bolte Bridge opens for traffic

21st century
2000 – New Melbourne Museum opened
2000 – CityLink freeways open, including two new tunnels, a new cross-harbour bridge, and electronic tolling
2000 – Docklands Stadium completed
2002 – Federation Square opens
2002 – Controversial Melbourne 2030 planning policy introduced, aimed to increase population in designated 'activity centres' and curb urban sprawl, promises to increase public transport usage to 20% of motorised trips by 2020
2003 – 2003 Melbourne Thunderstorm
2004 – Melbourne Victory FC is formed
2005 – 2005 Melbourne Thunderstorm
2006 – Southern Cross railway station redevelopment opens to passengers, renamed from Spencer Street station 
2006 – Commonwealth Games held in Melbourne
2006 – Construction on Eureka Tower is completed, making it the tallest building in Melbourne and tallest observation deck in the Southern Hemisphere.
2007 – 2007 FINA Swimming World Championships are held
2008 – New Eastlink freeway completed
2008 – M1 upgrade begins
2009 – Black Saturday bushfires around Melbourne, the worst fires in the history of the city leave 180 people dead
2009 – Melbourne Heart FC is formed
2009 – Melbourne's population reaches 4 million people, expanding by an unprecedented 90,000 people a year
2010 – Severe Thunderstorm 6 March, once in a century storm with 10 cm hail stones
2010 – Melbourne celebrates 175th birthday
2011 – Say Yes demonstrations draw 10,000 people who support increased investment in renewable energy
2015 – Construction commences on Australia 108 which, once complete, will be the tallest building in Melbourne
2017 – Six people were killed and thirty wounded in the January 2017 Bourke St car attack, followed by the death of one person and the injury of seventeen in the December 2017 Flinders St car attack
2018 – Major construction begins on the Metro Tunnel, a 9-km underground rail tunnel through the CBD and the biggest public transport project since the City Loop
2018 – 170,000 people march through the city in response to unfair working conditions and low wages
2019 – 300 Anti-Fascists and 150 Neo-Nazis clash at St Kilda beach
2020 – Melbourne is hit the hardest by the COVID-19 pandemic in Australia and as a result Melbourne becomes one of the most locked-down cities in the world
2021 - Melbourne officially becomes the most locked-down city in the world. Protests against strict lockdowns and mandatory vaccinations in the construction industry breakout throughout the city during the second half of the year. See COVID-19 protests in Australia

See also

History of Melbourne

References

Timeline of Melbourne history
Melbourne
Melbourne-related lists